A name–value pair, also called an attribute–value pair, key–value pair, or field–value pair, is a fundamental data representation in computing systems and applications. Designers often desire an open-ended data structure that allows for future extension without modifying existing code or data. In such situations, all or part of the data model may be expressed as a collection of 2-tuples in the form <attribute name, value> with each element being an attribute–value pair. Depending on the particular application and the implementation chosen by programmers, attribute names may or may not be unique.

Examples of use 
Some of the applications where information is represented as attribute–value pairs are:
 E-mail, in RFC 2822 headers
 Query strings, in URLs
 Optional elements in network protocols, such as IP, where they often appear as TLV (type–length–value) triples
 Bibliographic information, as in BibTeX and Dublin Core metadata
 Element attributes in SGML, HTML and XML
 Some kinds of database systems – namely a key–value database
 OpenStreetMap map data
 Windows registry entries
 Environment variables

Use in computer languages 
Some computer languages implement attribute–value pairs, or more frequently collections of attribute–value pairs, as standard language features. Most of these implement the general model of an associative array: an unordered list of unique attributes with associated values. As a result, they are not fully general; they cannot be used, for example, to implement electronic mail headers (which are ordered and non-unique).

In some applications, an attribute–value pair has a value that contains a nested collection of attribute–value pairs. Some data serialization formats such as JSON support arbitrarily deep nesting.
Other data representations are restricted to one level of nesting, such as INI file's section/name/value.

See also
 Attribute (computing)
 Entity–attribute–value model
 Key–value database
 Query string

References

Data modeling